"So Good" is the first single by Davina taken from her debut studio album, Best of Both Worlds. The single was released in February 1997 and peaked at number sixty on the Billboard Hot 100 chart. The song received two remixes, one by Raekwon and the other by Xzibit.

Background
"So Good" was produced by Davina.

Charts

References  

American contemporary R&B songs
1997 songs
1997 singles
Loud Records singles
Neo soul songs